Heinemann Library is an imprint of American book publishing company Capstone Publishers. It used to be a part of the educational publishing branch of the British book publishing company Heinemann.

References

Educational publishing companies of the United States
Book publishing company imprints
Educational book publishing companies